Nunome Dam is a gravity dam located in Nara prefecture in Japan. The dam is used for flood control and water supply. The catchment area of the dam is 75 km2. The dam impounds about 95  ha of land when full and can store 17300 thousand cubic meters of water. The construction of the dam was started in 1975 and completed in 1991.

References

Dams in Nara Prefecture
1991 establishments in Japan